KRC or krc may stand for:
 Kurdish Red Crescent a humanitarian non-profit responsible for aid throughout Kurdistan areas
 Kappa recognition factor or HIVEP3 protein
 Kent Recursive Calculator, a functional programming language
 Kenya Railways Corporation
 Kingston Rowing Club, on River Thames, England
 Korean Resource Center, Los Angeles, CA, US
 Sudan Khartoum Refinery Company
 Karachay-Balkar language, ISO 639 code
 Depati Parbo Airport IATA code
 K&R C, the original dialect of the C programming language, described in 1978 book by Kernighan and Dennis Ritchie

See also
 Krč